Kamil Kurowski (born 4 September 1994 in Nowy Sącz) is a Polish footballer who plays as an attacking midfielder for Sokół Ostróda.

Career 

Kurowski is a youth exponent from Legia Warsaw. He made 12 appearances for Kolejarz Stróże in the I liga during the 2012/13 season. He made his debut in the Polish Ekstraklasa at 27 July 2013 in a 1-2 home defeat against Górnik Zabrze. He was substituted at half-time for Łukasz Żegleń.

In March 2020, Kurowski returned to Legia, this time to play for their reserve team Legia II Warszawa in the III liga. He left the club in July 2021.

References

External links 
 

1994 births
Living people
Polish footballers
Association football midfielders
Ekstraklasa players
I liga players
II liga players
III liga players
Kolejarz Stróże players
Legia Warsaw II players
Legia Warsaw players
Podbeskidzie Bielsko-Biała players
Olimpia Grudziądz players
GKS Katowice players
Rozwój Katowice players
Sokół Ostróda players
Sportspeople from Nowy Sącz